The National Recreation and Park Association (NRPA) is the leading non-profit organization dedicated to the advancement of public parks, recreation and conservation. Their work draws national focus to the far-reaching impact of successes generated at the local level. NRPA’s members of park and recreation professionals and citizen advocates are more than 50,000 strong and represent public spaces in urban communities, rural settings and everything in between. The mission of the National Recreation and Park Association is "to advance parks, recreation, and conservation efforts that enhance the quality of life for all people."

History
The history and heritage of the public park and recreation field is preserved by the Joseph Lee Memorial Library and Archives located in NRPA’s headquarters in Ashburn, Virginia.

Their Work
The National Recreation and Park Association believes parks and recreation is used to improve a person’s potential by providing them with facilities, services, and programs that meet the emotional, social and physical needs of a community. NRPA values the environment by offering environmental educational programs, and striving for ecologically responsible management. NRPA not only values the community, but it takes a special interest in every individual it affects. It attempts to elevate the quality of life for all citizens of a community by endorsing individual and community wellness.  It partners up with many other respected organizations to provide a community with access to healthcare, cultural understanding and economic aid.

References

External links
National Recreation and Park Association Website
Parks & Recreation Magazine
NRPA Annual Conference Website

Environmental organizations based in Virginia
Parks in the United States